Coquelin is a French surname. Notable people with the surname include:

 Benoît-Constant Coquelin (1841–1909), French actor
 Charles Coquelin (1802–1852), French economist
 Ernest Alexandre Honoré Coquelin (1848–1909), French actor, brother of Benoît-Constant
 Francis Coquelin (born 1991), French footballer
 Jean Coquelin (1865–1944), French actor, son of Benoît-Constant
 Pierre Coquelin de Lisle (1900–1980), French sports shooter

French-language surnames